The Mujib coat is a tailored coat for men, designed as an arms cut-off (sleeveless), high-necked coat with two pockets in lower part and five or six buttons.  This used to be the signature garment worn by Bangabandhu Sheikh Mujibur Rahman, the founding father of the People's Republic of Bangladesh.

History
The Mujib coat is a transformation of the Nehru jacket, which was worn by Jawaharlal Nehru, the prime minister of India from 1947 to 1964. It is claimed by many that the coat worn by Sheikh Mujibur, known as the Mujib Coat, had six buttons which concurred with the Six-point charter of 1966. However, sources close to Rahman and senior Awami League leaders claimed that there was no relation between Mujib Coat and Six-point charter. Since when Sheikh Mujib started to wear this coat is not known clearly, but it is alleged that he started to wear it when Awami League was founded in 1949.  Kamal Hossain, who was Rahman's lawyer in the Agartala Conspiracy Case, and a very close political aide, stated that Rahman started to wear this distinctively designed coat from 1968 onwards.

Popularity
The coat is popular in Bangladesh. It is now recognized as an iconic honour, particularly among Awami League politicians who wear the Mujib Coat as part of their leader's ideology and tradition. The young generation wears the coat with many different styles.

See also

The Black Coat

References

Sheikh Mujibur Rahman
Memorials to Sheikh Mujibur Rahman
Jackets
 
Bangladeshi clothing
Bangladeshi fashion
History of fashion
1970s fashion
1970s fads and trends
2000s fashion